Eclectic is collaborative album between American guitarists Eric Johnson and Mike Stern. It was released on October 27, 2014. It was Johnson's first studio release since his 2010 album Up Close. The album features guest appearances by Malford Milligan and Christopher Cross.

Track listing
All songs written by Eric Johnson and Mike Stern, except where noted.

Personnel
 Eric Johnson – guitar, vocals, synthesizer, piano, producer
 Mike Stern – guitar, vocals
 Chris Maresh – acoustic and electric bass guitar
 Anton Fig – drums, percussion
 Malford Milligan – vocals ("Roll With it")
 Christopher Cross – vocals ("Wishing Well")
 Leni Stern – ngoni, vocals ("Big Foot," "Wherever You Go")
 Wayne Salzmann II – percussion ("Remember")
 Guy Forsyth – harmonica ("Red House")
 James Fenner – percussion ("Remember")
 Mike Mordecai – trombone ("Hullabaloo")
 Andrew Johnson – trumpet ("Hullabaloo")
 John Mills – saxophone ("Hullabaloo")
 Kelly Donnelly – mixing
 Paul Blakemore – mastering
 Josh Johnson – assistant engineer

References

External links
 Guitar World article
 Johnson's official website
 Stern's official website

Eric Johnson albums
2014 albums
Mike Stern albums